Narcao (Narcau o Nuracau in Sardinian language) is a comune (municipality) in the Province of South Sardinia in the Italian region Sardinia, located about  west of Cagliari and about  east of Carbonia.

Narcao borders the following municipalities: Carbonia, Iglesias, Nuxis, Perdaxius, Siliqua, Villamassargia, Villaperuccio.

In the frazione of Tarraseo there are remains of  a Punic-Roman temple dedicated to the goddess Demetra.

Twin towns
 Bovegno, Italy
 Les Rues-des-Vignes, France

References

External links

 Official website

Cities and towns in Sardinia